Symmorphus allobrogus is a species of potter wasps belonging to the subfamily Eumeninae.

Distribution
Species within this genus are present in most of Europe, in the eastern Palearctic realm, and in the Near East.

Description
They have a black thorax much longer than wide and a long and narrow abdomen with two yellow bands. The 4th abdominal tergite is usually completely black. The main segment of the antennae of males are completely black.

Biology
They nest in pre-existing cavities (twigs, stems, galls, old nests of other Hymenoptera, hollows in the wood). Adult females prey on caterpillars and larvae of beetles (Chrysomelidae, Curculionidae) to lay eggs in them. Adults fly from May to July.

References 

 Budrienė A, Budrys E, Nevronytė Ž.  Sexual size dimorphism in the ontogeny of the solitary predatory wasp Symmorphus allobrogus (Hymenoptera: Vespidae).
 Anna Budrienė & Eduardas Budrys - Behavioural Elements Influencing Mating Success of Symmorphus Allobrogus (Hymenoptera: Eumeninae)

External links
 Flickr

Potter wasps
Insects described in 1855